Nekemias grossedentata, known as moyeam, is a species of plant in the family Vitaceae. It is mainly distributed in central and southern China and Indochina. The leaves and stems are used to make a herbal tea called "moyeam". The product has been popular in China for generations and is now consumed in some other countries . The English name "moyeam" comes from the Chinese name "茅岩莓" (Pinyin:máo yán méi). Most moyeam is grown in Zhangjiajie, a mountainous region in Hunan Province in central China.

Plant features
Moyeam germinates in the spring and fades in the autumn. There is no significant difference between its primary and secondary roots. The largest annual production is in early summer, followed by autumn. The dorsal leaves are gray in the spring. Leaflets are thin, papery, or herbaceous, long, narrow, oblong, oval or needle-shaped. Their margins are coarsely toothed. Young stems and leaves are light reddish purple.

Production and processing

The method of processing this plant was developed by the Tujia minority group 600 years ago. It involves plucking, withering, rolling, and fermenting the leaves. The fresh leaves should be withered within five hours to avoid oxidization and loss of nutrients. The rolling step produces its distinctive "white frost" color and enhances the flavor. Unoxidized "white" moyeam is also produced, but the more demanding production process for white moyeam (similar to the method by which green tea is produced) makes it more expensive than traditional moyeam. Its distinctive taste is slightly bitter with a strongly sweet aftertaste; the slightly grassy flavor is somewhat different from other common teas in China.

Use
In Tujia settlements, it is common to prepare this tea in a similar manner as green tea and drink it directly for a naturally sweet flavor.

Nutritional values and chemical composition
Moyeam is rich in flavonoids, primarily dihydromyricetin; the average level in this plant can reach 40%.  It is becoming more popular with Chinese people, particularly among health-conscious consumers, due to its high level of flavonoids. It does not contain the antioxidant epigallocatechin-3-gallate (EGCG) found in green tea.

Geographical environment
Moyeam grows in Zhangjiajie's high mountains at 800–1500 m in elevation. The water, air and soil are isolated from contamination. The red sandstone soil is rich in nutrients, which is very conducive to the formation of flavonoids, vitamins and trace elements in this plant.

Similar plants are also found in other provinces of China, mainly south of the Yangtze River. A few studies  have also mentioned its growth in southeast Asia countries.

History
In 1385, it was given to the king of the Tujia minority as a present that was claimed to cure diseases. At that time, it was named "heaven tea". In 1837, during the Qing dynasty, it was given to the Emperor of China as a present from the Tujia. The Emperor found that the tea had amazing health effects, so he ordered that the tea be exclusively for himself. 

Moyeam is still made using the 600-year-old method of the Tujia. It is said that only females are taught how to make it.

References

External links
 

grossedentata
Crops originating from China
Chinese cuisine
Plants used in traditional Chinese medicine